Calgary-Falconridge is a provincial electoral district in Alberta, Canada. The district will be one of 87 districts mandated to return a single member (MLA) to the Legislative Assembly of Alberta using the first past the post method of voting. It was contested for the first time in the 2019 Alberta election.

Geography
The district is located in northeastern Calgary, containing the neighbourhoods of Whitehorn, Temple, Castleridge, Falconridge, Coral Springs, and the eastern part of Taradale.

History

The district was created in 2017 when the Electoral Boundaries Commission recommended reorganizing the districts in northeast Calgary, abolishing Calgary-Greenway and shifting the other ridings eastward. Calgary-Falconridge took the neighbourhoods of Whitehorn and Temple from Calgary-East, Castleridge and Falconridge from Calgary-McCall, and Coral Springs and part of Taradale from Calgary-Greenway. This resulted in a district 13% above the average population, but the Commission justified this by pointing out that there were no plans to build new housing stock in this area.

Electoral results

References

Alberta provincial electoral districts